Zinc finger SWIM-type containing 3 is a protein that in humans is encoded by the ZSWIM3 gene.

References

Further reading